William A. Morgan (born 1914, date of death unknown) was an English Association footballer, who played in goal for Coventry City F.C. between 1932 and 1939. He was born in Ryton-on-Tyne.

References

1914 births
Year of death missing
English footballers
Association football goalkeepers
Coventry City F.C. players
English Football League players